The Anglo Colombian School (Colegio Anglo-Colombiano in Spanish) is a bilingual private school in Bogota, Colombia. The Colegio Anglo-Colombiano has been an IB World School since February 1980. It offers the full International Baccalaureate Organization programmes: the IB Primary Years Programme, IB Middle Years Programme and IB Diploma Programme.

The School was established by a renowned group of Colombian and British private citizens (including four previous ambassadors, among which stands out Jaime Jaramillo Arango) inspired by the principles of traditional British education, including the time-honoured house system. It is one of the most renowned laic schools in Bogota and is one of the only schools that continue the British tradition of formal uniform. The uniform is composed of a dark green tie with stripes the colour of the house to which the student belongs, a white shirt, a dark green blazer and grey trousers (skirts for girls). It holds a very strict policy regarding grade repetition and discipline in general. Additionally, the majority of the classes are in English and the staff is composed of both foreign and Colombian teachers.

The Anglo Colombiano School offers an extremely ample variety of IB Diploma subjects, including: English A, Spanish A and B, German B, French B, Physics, Biology, Chemistry, Economics, Business Management, Geography, History, Philosophy, global politics, psychology, Design Technology, Information Technology in a Global Society (ITGS), Computer Science, Mathematics, Mathematical Studies (only Standard Level), Visual Arts, Music, Film and Theatre.

The Colegio Anglo Colombiano also offers a large variety of extracurricular activities, ranging from karate to piano and from football to ballet. The school belongs to the Uncoli Organization. The Uncoli is a union of international schools in Bogota. They are the governing body of all inter-school competitions and provide the organizational support for sporting, academic and artistic events among the schools. As its sport facilities are very diverse and appropriate for big events, it is often chosen to host Uncoli tournaments.

The school theatre: "Centro Cultural William Shakespeare" (William Shakespeare Cultural Centre), located in the school campus, contains 551 seats, of which 321 can be retracted in order to provide a much bigger stage. The theatre is used to hold big assemblies or conferences, the annual dance choreography competitions and any other school events that may require such conditions. Occasionally the school grants permission for outside (not related to the school) events to be hosted in the theatre, as it is one of Bogota's biggest and most well-equipped theatres.

House system

These are the corresponding naval officers and colours for each of the houses:

House events involve dance (organized choreography) competitions, debates, academic decathlons, sports day, creative writing and poetry composition contests and overall academic performance of students. The house that wins the most events is announced at the end of the school year. This allows for students to develop teamwork skills and unity towards their house since they are young.

The Anglo Colombiano School hosts one of the most important Model United Nations called CACMUN, held every year. In this conference, schools from all Colombia have important participation such as Colegio San Carlos, Gimnasio los Caobos, The English School (Colegio de Inglaterra), Colegio Los Nogales, among many others.

Notable alumni

 Juan Lozano Ramírez - Colombian Senator and Statesman.
 Simón Gaviria - Youngest congressman in the Colombian lower chamber. Best friends with Pedro Luna 
 Juan Gabriel Vásquez - Author.
 María Teresa Ronderos - Journalist.
 Sergio Jaramillo Caro - Colombian politician and High Commissioner of Peace.
 Virginia Vallejo - Author and media personality.

External links

 Anglo Colombian School official website
 Anglo Colombian School official website 
 International Baccalaureate Organization official website
 Anglo Alumni Portal

International Baccalaureate schools in Colombia
Round Square schools
International schools in Bogotá
Bilingual schools
1956 establishments in Colombia
Educational institutions established in 1956